Mr. and Mrs. Is the Name is a 1935 Warner Bros. Merrie Melodies cartoon directed by Friz Freleng. The short was released on January 19, 1935, and stars Buddy and Cookie as two mer-kids.

Plot
Mermaids sing to the audience about mermaids and fishes at play; they and some other sea creatures dance to the song. A young merman who resembles Buddy plays tag with a mermaid resembling Cookie, but she is offended when he "tags" her a bit too hard. Buddy looks inside a sunken ship and drags Cookie to it.  She gleefully adorns herself with jewelry she finds in a treasure chest. Meanwhile, Buddy finds some props in another trunk and does an imitation of Charlie Chaplin.

Cookie finds a piano and plays the title song. The noise draws an octopus, who grabs her and swims off, with Buddy in pursuit.  The octopus drops Cookie to fight Buddy, and does do so with some success until Buddy lures it into a pipe and ties the octopus's tentacles to a flange, then starts bashing the octopus with a battering ram. Cookie kisses Buddy; he blushes, then gets hit by the battering ram into her arms.

Identity of the protagonists
The two mer-characters who find a treasure trove resemble Buddy and Cookie, but are not actually named. This may be Buddy's first color appearance, but whether it was intended as an official part of his sub-series is in doubt. It is frequently stated that Buddy was featured in 23 animated films. They would be 24 if Mr. and Mrs. Is the Name is included.

References

External links
 

1935 films
1935 animated films
American fantasy comedy films
1930s fantasy comedy films
Films scored by Bernard B. Brown
Films scored by Norman Spencer (composer)
Short films directed by Friz Freleng
Buddy (Looney Tunes) films
Films about mermaids
Merrie Melodies short films
Warner Bros. Cartoons animated short films
1930s Warner Bros. animated short films
1930s English-language films